In Islamic demonology, Thabr (ثبر) is one of the five sons of Iblis mentioned by Muslim ibn al-Hajjaj. He is a devil who causes calamities and injuries.  His four brothers are named: Awar (اعور or لأعوار), Zalambur (زلنبور), Sut (مسوط), and Dasim (داسم). Each of them is linked to another psychological function, which they try to encourage to prevent humans spiritual development.

References

Demons in Islam